Way Down in the Jungle Room is a compilation album by American singer Elvis Presley. It was released on August 5, 2016 by RCA Records and Legacy Recordings. The album features master recordings and outtakes from two recording sessions on February 2–8, 1976 and October 28–30, 1976 in the Jungle Room, a recording studio set up by Elvis in the den of Graceland in Memphis, Tennessee. The first disc subtitled The Masters features material from these sessions that were later released on From Elvis Presley Boulevard, Memphis, Tennessee (1976), and the subsequent final studio album, Moody Blue (1977). The second disc, The Outtakes, features outtakes and "in-the-studio dialog" newly mixed by Matt Ross-Spang at the Sam Phillips Recording Studio.

Commercial performance
In the United Kingdom, the album debuted at number 16 on the UK Albums Chart with first-week sales of 3,665 units. The album debuted at number 6 on the Top Country Albums and number 79 on the Billboard 200 with 7,000 equivalent album units. The album has sold 14,000 copies as of September 2016.

Track listing

Charts

References

2016 compilation albums
Compilation albums published posthumously
Elvis Presley compilation albums
Albums recorded in a home studio